The Artin reciprocity law,  which was established by Emil Artin in a series of papers (1924; 1927; 1930), is a general theorem in number theory that forms a central part of global class field theory. The term "reciprocity law" refers to a long line of more concrete number theoretic statements which it generalized, from the quadratic reciprocity law and the reciprocity laws of Eisenstein and Kummer to Hilbert's product formula for the norm symbol. Artin's result provided a partial solution to Hilbert's ninth problem.

Statement 

Let  be a Galois extension of global fields and  stand for the idèle class group 
One of the statements of the Artin reciprocity law is that there is a canonical isomorphism called the global symbol map

 

where  denotes the abelianization of a group. The map  is defined by assembling the maps called the local Artin symbol, the local reciprocity map or the norm residue symbol

 

More precisely,  is given by the local maps  on the -component of an idèle class. The maps  are isomorphisms. This is the content of the local reciprocity law, a main theorem of local class field theory.

Proof

A cohomological proof of the global reciprocity law can be achieved by first establishing that

 

constitutes a class formation in the sense of Artin and Tate. Then one proves that

 

where  denote the Tate cohomology groups. Working out the cohomology groups establishes that  is an isomorphism.

Significance 

Artin's reciprocity law implies a description of the abelianization of the absolute Galois group of a global field K which is based on the Hasse local–global principle and the use of the Frobenius elements. Together with the Takagi existence theorem, it is used to describe the abelian extensions of K in terms of the arithmetic of K and to understand the behavior of the nonarchimedean places in them. Therefore, the Artin reciprocity law can be interpreted as one of the main theorems of global class field theory. It can be used to prove that Artin L-functions are meromorphic, and also to prove the Chebotarev density theorem.

Two years after the publication of his general reciprocity law in 1927, Artin rediscovered the transfer homomorphism of I. Schur and used the reciprocity law to translate the principalization problem for ideal classes of algebraic number fields into the group theoretic task of determining the kernels of transfers of finite non-abelian groups.

Finite extensions of global fields
The definition of the Artin map for a finite abelian extension L/K of global fields (such as a finite abelian extension of ) has a concrete description in terms of prime ideals and Frobenius elements.

If Δ denotes the relative discriminant of L/K, the Artin symbol (or Artin map, or (global) reciprocity map) of L/K is defined on the group of prime-to-Δ fractional ideals, by linearity:

The Artin reciprocity law (or global reciprocity law) states that there is a modulus c of K such that the Artin map induces an isomorphism

Such a modulus c is called a defining modulus for L/K. The smallest defining modulus is called the conductor of L/K and typically denoted

Examples

Quadratic fields
The Artin map is then defined on primes p that do not divide Δ by

where  is the Kronecker symbol.

Cyclotomic fields

Relation to quadratic reciprocity
Let p and  be distinct odd primes. For convenience, let  (which is always 1 (mod 4)). Then, quadratic reciprocity states that

The relation between the quadratic and Artin reciprocity laws is given by studying the quadratic field  and the cyclotomic field  as follows. First, F is a subfield of L, so if H = Gal(L/F) and  then  Since the latter has order 2, the subgroup H must be the group of squares in  A basic property of the Artin symbol says that for every prime-to-ℓ ideal (n)

When n = p, this shows that  if and only if, p modulo ℓ is in H, i.e. if and only if, p is a square modulo ℓ.

Statement in terms of L-functions 

An alternative version of the reciprocity law, leading to the Langlands program, connects Artin L-functions associated to abelian extensions of a number field with Hecke L-functions associated to characters of the idèle class group.

A Hecke character (or Größencharakter) of a number field K is defined to be a quasicharacter of the idèle class group of K. Robert Langlands interpreted Hecke characters as automorphic forms on the reductive algebraic group GL(1) over the ring of adeles of K.

Let  be an abelian Galois extension with Galois group G. Then for any character  (i.e. one-dimensional complex representation of the group G), there exists a Hecke character  of K such that

where the left hand side is the Artin L-function associated to the extension with character σ and the right hand side is the Hecke L-function associated with χ, Section 7.D of.

The formulation of the Artin reciprocity law as an equality of L-functions allows formulation of a generalisation to n-dimensional representations, though a direct correspondence is still lacking.

Notes

References 

Emil Artin (1924) "Über eine neue Art von L-Reihen", Abhandlungen aus dem Mathematischen Seminar der Universität Hamburg 3: 89–108; Collected Papers, Addison Wesley (1965), 105–124
Emil Artin (1927) "Beweis des allgemeinen Reziprozitätsgesetzes", Abhandlungen aus dem Mathematischen Seminar der Universität Hamburg 5: 353–363; Collected Papers, 131–141
Emil Artin (1930) "Idealklassen in Oberkörpern und allgemeines Reziprozitätsgesetzes", Abhandlungen aus dem Mathematischen Seminar der Universität Hamburg 7: 46–51; Collected Papers, 159–164

 

Class field theory